Karel Nepomucký (born 20 July 1939 in Prague) is a Czech former football player who competed in the 1964 Summer Olympics.

References

External links
 
 

1939 births
Living people
Czechoslovak footballers
Czechoslovakia international footballers
Olympic footballers of Czechoslovakia
Olympic silver medalists for Czechoslovakia
Olympic medalists in football
Footballers at the 1964 Summer Olympics
Medalists at the 1964 Summer Olympics
SK Slavia Prague players
Footballers from Prague
Association football midfielders
Czech footballers